Crimple Valley Viaduct, also known as Crimple Viaduct and Crimple Beck Viaduct is a railway viaduct which crosses the Crimple Valley between Pannal railway station and Hornbeam Park railway station in North Yorkshire. It is a Grade II* listed structure.

The sharp bend in the track on the south side of the viaduct causes trains to reduce speed significantly, especially on the northbound journey. Older Pacer rolling stock units are locally known to loudly squeal whilst passing around the tight bend due to increased pressure on the bogies and wheels.  

It was completed in 1848 to designs by George Hudson for the York and North Midland Railway company and built of rusticated grit stone ashlar. The contractor was James Bray.

References 

Railway viaducts in North Yorkshire
Bridges completed in 1848
Grade II* listed buildings in North Yorkshire
Grade II* listed railway bridges and viaducts